The Saguache Downtown Historic District, a historic district in Saguache, Colorado, was listed on the National Register of Historic Places in 2014.  The listing included 32 contributing buildings and four contributing structures.

It was deemed significant "for its historic role as the commercial center of the Town of Saguache and the upper San Luis Valley since its founding in 1874. The district is further locally significant [for its] intact collection of one- and two-story late nineteenth- and early
twentieth century commercial buildings, including an impressive number of buildings featuring false front and adobe construction."

References

Historic districts on the National Register of Historic Places in Colorado
National Register of Historic Places in Saguache County, Colorado
Buildings and structures completed in 1874